The Social Democratic Party (SDS) is a centre-left political party in Serbia.

The party was founded and is headed by Boris Tadić, who was previously president of the Democratic Party and the former President of Serbia. Between June and October 2014, the name of the party was the New Democratic Party (NDS). In May 2019, the party formed a union with Democratic Party and Together for Serbia. It supports accession of Serbia to the European Union and it is a member of the Progressive Alliance.

History
Tadić revealed in February 2014 his intention to secede from the Democratic Party and to form a new party to take part in the 2014 parliamentary election. But, after realizing that they don't have enough time to register a new party before the election, Tadić and his supporters made a deal with the Greens of Serbia. As part of this deal, Tadić and his supporters joined the Greens of Serbia, and then on 10 February 2014 the name of the party was changed to the "New Democratic Party – Greens". Although Ivan Karić was still officially president of this party, Tadić became its de facto leader. Party then participated in the 2014 parliamentary election under that name in coalition with Together for Serbia, League of Social Democrats of Vojvodina and some other minor parties. This coalition won 5.7% of the electoral vote and 18 seats in the National Assembly of Serbia. Of these, 11 seats were allocated to the "New Democratic Party – Greens", but only one to the original Greens (Ivan Karić) and 10 to the group around Boris Tadić.

After the 2014 parliamentary election, a divergence emerged in the "New Democratic Party – Greens" between the original Greens and group of members that joined the party with Tadić. On 14 June, Tadić and his supporters decided to secede from the Greens and form "New Democratic Party" as a separate party, while the name of the "New Democratic Party—Greens" was changed back to the "Greens of Serbia". In the National Assembly, 10 deputies of the New Democratic Party are part of the parliamentary group of 12 deputies together with Ivan Karić of the Greens and Blagoje Bradić of Together for Serbia, and they are in the opposition to the current Government of Serbia.

First internal party elections were held on 4 October 2014. Boris Tadić was elected president of the party. On the same day, the official name of the party was changed to the "Social Democratic Party".

As of January 2017, the Social Democratic Party holds four seats in the National Assembly of Serbia. It exists in a parliamentary alliance with the People's Movement of Serbia, which holds one seat.

On 10 January 2022, it was announced that the Democrats of Serbia, a break-away faction from the Democratic Party, will merge with SDS.

Presidents of the Social Democratic Party (2014–present)

Electoral results

Parliamentary elections

Presidential elections

References

External links
Official website

2014 establishments in Serbia
Political parties established in 2014
Pro-European political parties in Serbia
Progressive Alliance
Social democratic parties in Serbia
Democratic Party (Serbia) breakaway groups
Centre-left parties in Europe